The Nyköping Banquet was King Birger of Sweden's Christmas celebration  11December 1317 at Nyköping Castle in Sweden. Among the guests were his two brothers Duke Valdemar and Duke Eric, who later that night were imprisoned and subsequently starved to death in the dungeon of Nyköping Castle.

Prelude 
The dukes Valdemar and Eric, brothers of King Birger, had earlier staged a coup against the king (Håtuna games). After the intervention of the Danish and Norwegian kings, a settlement was reached in 1310 and Sweden was divided among the brothers into three sovereign states.

Treacherous arrests 
Seven years later, the dukes Valdemar and Eric were invited as a sign of reconciliation to celebrate Christmas with King Birger and Queen Märta at Nyköping Castle. The banquet was held on the night between 10 and 11December 1317. The dukes' retinues were lodged not in the castle, but in the town of Nyköping, the pretext being lack of space. After both dukes had retired to bed, the king's drost Brunke (Johan von Brunkow) arrived with a company of crossbowmen and manacled them. The following morning, the dukes' retinues were also apprehended.

According to the Eric Chronicles, King Birger himself was present, reminding the dukes of the Håtuna Games:
Mynnes jder nakot aff hatwna leek? Fulgörla mynnes han mik
(Remember ye aught of the Håtuna Games? I remember them clearly)

Imprisonment 
The dukes were imprisoned in the castle's dungeon. They knew that no mercy would be forthcoming from Birger so they had their wills drawn up after five weeks. These documents, dated 18January 1318, survive today. Soon thereafter, both dukes died in the dungeon, according to tradition by drawn-out starvation. According to legend, King Birger threw the keys to the dungeon into the Nyköping river. A large medieval key was indeed found during the 19th century near the castle.

King Birger, however, had misjudged the political situation in the country. A rebellion broke out in 1318 against his rule, and he was forced to flee to Gotland, whence he soon had to continue his flight to Denmark.

Aftermath 
The three-year-old son of Duke Eric, Magnus, was elected King in 1319 by the Stone of Mora in Uppland. King Birger's son Magnus resisted forces that tried to take the Castle of Nyköping, but Magnus was defeated and fled with the drost Brunke. They lost a sea action and were captured and executed in 1320. The drost Brunke was executed in Stockholm on the sandy ridge that has since been known as Brunkeberg. The deposed king Birger died in 1321 in exile in Denmark.

Thus, of the royal family, there remained only the old queen mother Helvig of Holstein, (spouse of Magnus Ladulås), the exiled Queen Märta, and the young king Magnus Eriksson, son of the dead Duke Eric.

See also 
 Black Dinner

References

External links 
 Shack och makt – Sörmlands museum (in Swedish)

1317 in Europe
Political history of Sweden
Conflicts in 1317
14th century in Sweden